Isidoros Koutsidis (born 23 December 2004) is a Greek professional footballer who plays as a centre-back for Super League 2 club Olympiacos B.

References

2004 births
Living people
Greek footballers
Super League Greece 2 players
Football League (Greece) players
Panserraikos F.C. players
Olympiacos F.C. players
Association football defenders
Olympiacos F.C. B players
PAOK FC players
Sportspeople from Nicosia